Dalma Gálfi and Fanny Stollár were the defending champions, but chose not to participate this year.

Usue Maitane Arconada and Claire Liu won the title, defeating Mariam Bolkvadze and Caty McNally in the final, 6–2, 6–3.

Seeds

Draw

Finals

Top half

Bottom half

External links 
 Girls' Doubles Draw

Girls' Doubles
Wimbledon Championship by year – Girls' doubles
Wimbledon